T. variabilis  may refer to:
 Thamniochloris variabilis, an alga species in the genus Thamniochloris
 Tillandsia variabilis, a plant species native to Bolivia, Costa Rica, Mexico and the United States
 Tramitichromis variabilis, a fish species found in Malawi, Mozambique and Tanzania
 Trialeurodes variabilis, the papaya whitefly, an insect species in the genus Trialeurodes
 Typhula variabilis, a plant pathogen species